The Gallant Hussar is a 1928 German-British romance film directed by Géza von Bolváry and starring Ivor Novello, Evelyn Holt, and Paul Hörbiger. It was based on a story by the Hungarian writer Arthur Bárdos and Margarete-Maria Langen.

The film was a co-production made under an agreement between Gainsborough Pictures and the German studio Felsom-Film and was shot in Berlin. After the passage of the Cinematograph Films Act 1927 by the British Parliament it was classified under the terms of the Act as a foreign film and only received a limited release in Britain. It is also known under the alternative title The Bold Dragoon. It is now considered a lost film.

Along with A South Sea Bubble (1928), the film marked a significant change in the role played by Novello. He had previously appeared as unsettled, outsider figures in films such as The Lodger, but from now on played more well-balanced romantic figures.

Synopsis
The daughter of an American millionaire falls in love with a Hungarian hussar officer during a visit to the Austrian Empire.

Cast

References

Bibliography

External links

1927 films
1920s romance films
British romance films
Films of the Weimar Republic
British silent feature films
German silent feature films
Films directed by Géza von Bolváry
Gainsborough Pictures films
Films set in the 1900s
Films set in Hungary
Films set in Austria
Lost British films
British black-and-white films
German black-and-white films
1920s British films
1920s German films